Japonaiserie was the term used by Dutch post-impressionist painter Vincent van Gogh to express the influence of Japanese art on his works.

Background 
Before 1854, trade with Japan was limited to a Dutch monopoly, and Japanese goods imported into Europe primarily comprised porcelain and lacquer ware. The Convention of Kanagawa ended the 200-year Japanese foreign policy of Seclusion and opened up trade between Japan and the West. From the 1860s, ukiyo-e, Japanese woodblock prints, became a source of inspiration for many Western artists.

Influence of Japanese art on van Gogh 

Van Gogh's interest in Japanese prints began when he discovered illustrations by Félix Régamey featured in The Illustrated London News and Le Monde Illustré. Régamey created woodblock prints, followed Japanese techniques, and often depicted scenes of Japanese life. Beginning in 1885, Van Gogh switched from collecting magazine illustrations, such as Régamey, to collecting ukiyo-e prints which could be bought in small Parisian shops. Van Gogh bought Japanese ukiyo-e woodcuts in the docklands of Antwerp, later incorporating elements of their style into the background of some of his paintings. Vincent possessed twelve prints from Hiroshige's series One Hundred Famous Views of Edo, and he also had bought Two Girls Bathing by Kunisada II, 1868. These prints were influential to his artistic development.

He shared his collection with his contemporaries and organized a Japanese print exhibition in Paris in 1887. He and his brother Theo van Gogh dealt in these prints for some time, eventually amassing hundreds of them, which are now housed in the Van Gogh Museum in Amsterdam.

A month later he wrote,

Van Gogh made three copies of ukiyo-e prints, The Courtesan and the two studies after Hiroshige.

Van Gogh's dealing in ukiyo-e prints brought him into contact with Siegfried Bing, who was prominent in the introduction of Japanese art to the West and later in the development of Art Nouveau. Van Gogh developed an idealised conception of the Japanese artist which led him to the Yellow House at Arles and his attempt to form a utopian art colony there with Paul Gauguin.

Style 
Van Gogh admired the techniques of Japanese artists.

Characteristic features of ukiyo-e prints include their ordinary subject matter, the distinctive cropping of their compositions, bold and assertive outlines, absent or unusual perspective, flat regions of uniform colour, uniform lighting, absence of chiaroscuro, and their emphasis on decorative patterns. One or more of these features can be found in numbers of Vincent's paintings from his Antwerp period onwards.

Japonaiserie and Impressionism 
In a letter to Theo dated 5 June 1888, Vincent remarked,In a letter of July 1888 he referred to the Impressionists as the "French Japanese".

The Courtesan (after Eisen) 

The May 1886 edition of Paris Illustré was devoted to Japan with text by Tadamasa Hayashi who may have inspired van Gogh's utopian notion of the Japanese artist:

The cover carried a reverse image of a colour woodblock by Keisai Eisen depicting a Japanese courtesan or Oiran. Vincent traced this and enlarged it to produce his painting.

Copies of Hiroshige prints 

Van Gogh made copies of two Hiroshige prints. He altered their colours and added borders filled with calligraphic characters he borrowed from other prints.

Example ukiyo-e colour woodblock prints 
Eisen: The Feast of Seven Herbs.
Eisen and  others: 22 Japanese woodcuts, Connecticut College, Connecticut
Eisen: Opening Night in the Theater District for Two Theaters of Edo (Edo ryôza Shibai-machi kaomise no zu).
Hiroshige: Sudden Shower over Atake (1857), Brooklyn Museum, New York
Hiroshige: Plum Estate, Kameido (1857), Brooklyn Museum, New York
Hiroshige: Maple Trees at Mama, Tekona Shrine (1857), Brooklyn Museum, New York
Hiroshige: Ushimachi, Takanawa  (1857), Brooklyn Museum, New York
Hiroshige: Fireworks at Ryōgoku   (1857), Brooklyn Museum, New York

Hiroshige: Yui, Satta Peak.
Hiroshige: (various).
Hokusai: Abe No Nakamaro, Fitzwilliam Museum, Cambridge
Hokusai (attrib.): The Shishi-Mai Dance, Royal Academy of Arts, London
Sharaku: The Actors Nakamura Wadaemon and Nakamura Konoz.
Utamaro: Girl at her Toilet with two female attendants and male admirer, Birmingham Museums and Art Gallery, Birmingham
Utamaro: Women sewing.
Utamaro: Picture Book of Crawling Creatures (1788)s, Fitzwilliam Museum, Cambridge

Illustrative Van Gogh oil paintings on canvas

In the Van Gogh Museum, Amsterdam 
Houses seen from the Back (1885, Antwerp).
The Courtesan (1887).
The Bridge in the Rain (after Hiroshige), (1887).
Flowering Plum Orchard (after Hiroshige), (1887).
Sprig of Flowering Almond in a Glass (1888).
The Bedroom (1888).
Fishing Boats on the Beach at Les Saintes-Maries-de-la-Mer (1888).
The Rock of Montmajour with Pine Trees (1888), pen and brush.
The Langlois Bridge (1888).
The Harvest (1888).
The Sower (1888).
Almond Blossom (1890).

Outside the Netherlands 

Vincent's  Chair with Pipe (1888), National Gallery, London
Sunflowers (1888), National Gallery, London

See also 
 List of works by Vincent van Gogh
 Copies by Vincent van Gogh
Japonism

References

External links 

Paintings by Vincent van Gogh
Paintings of Paris by Vincent van Gogh
Series of paintings by Vincent van Gogh
1887 paintings
Japonisme
Articles containing video clips